The Followers is the second of the Special Edition copies in Jude Watson's Jedi Apprentice series. It was released on April 1, 2002. Its story revolves around Obi-Wan Kenobi and Qui-Gon Jinn as Jedi prior to Star Wars: Episode I – The Phantom Menace.

Plot
As an apprentice, Obi-Wan Kenobi faced off against the leader of a Sith cult. A generation later, he and his own apprentice, Anakin Skywalker, discover the cult still exists and it has plans for revenge that threatens the hearts of the Jedi.

External links
Official CargoBay Listing

2002 British novels
2002 science fiction novels
Star Wars: Jedi Apprentice
Star Wars Legends novels
English novels